Horithyatira is a genus of moths belonging to the subfamily Thyatirinae of the Drepanidae.

Species
Horithyatira decorata (Moore, 1881)
Horithyatira diehli (Werny, 1966)
Horithyatira javanica (Werny, 1966)
Horithyatira ornata (Roepke, 1944)

Excluded species
Horithyatira delattini is now Thyatira delattini Werny, 1966

References

Thyatirinae
Drepanidae genera